Der Stern von Afrika is a 1957 black-and-white German war film portraying the combat career of a World War II Luftwaffe fighter pilot Hans-Joachim Marseille. The film stars Joachim Hansen and Marianne Koch and was directed by Alfred Weidenmann, whose film career began in the Nazi era.

Der Stern von Afrika was premièred on 13 August 1957 in Berlin and was popular at the German box office. The film was criticised for hewing closely to wartime propaganda in its portrayal of the German war effort and for avoiding an honest confrontation with the past.

Plot
The film begins shortly before the outbreak of World War II with Jochen Marseille (Joachim Hansen) attending a Luftwaffe (Air Force) school in Berlin. His squadron is transferred to the Africa Corps in North Africa. Marseille quickly becomes the most successful fighter pilot.

His unit loses more and more pilots to the Desert Air Force, and Marseille begins to doubt the usefulness of his operations. He travels to Berlin to receive a high military decoration where he falls in love with a teacher, Brigitte (Marianne Koch).

The couple go to Rome where Marseille is to receive a decoration. The distraught Brigitte tries to persuade him to defect, but he returns to North Africa. During a flight over Egypt, his aircraft suffers an engine failure and crashes. Marseille attempts to take to his parachute, but his body is later found in the desert. Brigitte receives the news of his death.

Cast

Joachim Hansen as Jochen Marseille
Marianne Koch as Brigitte
Hansjörg Felmy as Robert Franke
Horst Frank as Albin Droste
Peer Schmidt as Answald Sommer
Alexander Kerst as Major Niemeyer
Gisela von Collande as Marseille's mother
Arno Paulsen as Marseille's father
Siegfried Schürenberg as the director of the school
Christian Doermer as Unteroffizier Klein
Hans Hermann Schaufuß
Albert Hehn as Major Schliemann
Erich Ponto as the French billiard player
Carl Lange as Hauptmann Krusenberg
Roberto Blanco (as Roberto Zerquera) as Mathias
Fernando Sancho as Unteroffizier Strauch

Production
Writer Herbert Reinecker and director Alfred Weidenmann had started a productive streak of collaborations in 1941, when Reinecker had published a historical novel in a series of children's book edited by Weidenmann.

As specialists for propaganda specifically targeting the German youth both teamed up as writer and director in 1944 to make Junge Adler (Young Eagles), one of the most successful and renowned  Nazi propaganda movies. After the war Weidenmann helped Reinecker to reenter the film business. During the 1950s they did several movies of various genres together, among them documentaries, comedies and crime films, but also the spy movie Canaris (1954).

Reinecker based his script of Der Stern von Afrika upon a "factual report" by journalist Udo Wolter in the magazine Revue.

Several actors, who would later become well known stars of German cinema and television such as Hansjörg Felmy and Horst Frank, made their screen debut with Der Stern von Afrika. The Cuban Roberto Zerquera, who was cast by Weidenmann on the spot when they accidentally met on an aircraft, would later make a career in Germany as a singer under the stage name Roberto Blanco.

The movie was edited by Carl Otto Bartning, who had worked on the Nazi aviation propaganda movies Feuertaufe and Kampfgeschwader Lützow with director Hans Bertram. In 1941, Bartning had also collaborated with effects cameraman Karl Ludwig Ruppel to make the semidocumentary Front am Himmel (Front in the Sky). Ruppel worked on Der Stern von Afrika. Here he used British traveling matte techniques to incorporate model airplanes. Mechanical effects and explosives were designed by Erwin Lange, who had also worked on Pour le Mérite (1938), Stukas (1941), Quax the Crash Pilot (1941) and Kolberg (1943-44) and would continue to be involved in war movies like Paths of Glory (1957), Stalingrad: Dogs, Do You Want to Live Forever? (1958), Die Brücke (1959) as well as The Vikings (1957) and Cleopatra (1960-1962). Eduard Neumann, the former Geschwaderkommodore (wing commander) of Jagdgeschwader 27 (27th fighter wing) and Marseille's commanding officer, served as a technical advisor on the film.

Der Stern von Afrika was produced by the Neue Münchner Lichtspielkunst GmbH - Neue Emelka. For financing the Neue Emelka applied to the Berliner Revisions- und Treuhand Aktiengesellschaft through which the Federal Republic of Germany granted loans for movie projects. To the Treuhand the Neue Emelka advertised its project as a kind of counter movie to Des Teufels General. Their film, they claimed, would be indispensable to foster military preparedness.

The application was turned down, however, because the German Ministry of the Interior and the Ministry of Defence admonished the script. The producers managed to raise the production cost of DM 1,3 million by themselves, not at least because they received support from Francoist Spain. The Spanish Air Force provided aircraft, pilots, personnel and any military material needed.

Release
A first version of Der Stern von Afrika was screened to representatives of the German Ministries of Defence and the Interior on 20 February 1957. The Ministry of Defence asked for several cuts, because it feared the film would tend to romanticization and could provoke the impression that it followed Nazi German propaganda suggesting the invasion of Poland was somehow provoked by Polish attacks.

The ministry further asked that any reference to Hitler would be left out and that the film would not end with a scene in which Marseille's fiancé receives the message of his death while teaching a school class. It was perceived that this would lead the audience to conclude that the children of the 1940s were to become soldiers again in the present. In general, however, both ministries now supported the film, which they considered to be an authentic portrayal of the spirit of German fighter pilots in 1942. They saw and acknowledged in it a general tendency to depict the hardships and problems of the war, while positively honoring the human value of soldierly achievements and comradeship.

With that endorsement, the Emelka applied for a final grant from the Treuhand. It was once again turned down, most likely because the Treuhand feared that the film would be banned out of political concerns. In fact, in May 1957 the Freiwillige Selbstkontrolle der Filmwirtschaft (FSK) initially did not approve the film, because it perceived "national socialist tendencies" and, in particular, because it thought that the historical situation was inappropriately distorted. It is neither clear, how the FSK came to that conclusion, nor what made it change its mind, but the film was approved soon after.

In June 1957, the Press and Information Agency of the Federal Government (Bundespresseamt) provided for the last DM 300,000 needed for post-production, but ensured that it would not be publicly involved by channeling the money through a private bank and another company.

The film distributor advertised Der Stern von Afrika by claiming that "it had been about time, that a German production showed how splendid the German fighter pilots actually had been, the more so, as we can present the absolute world record holder in this field, the Captain Hans-Joachim Marseille". The movie premiered on 13 August 1957 in Hannover with Marseille's mother attending.

Reception
Der Stern von Afrika proved to be successful at the box office. Newspapers reported that the audiences were "most pleasantly shaken", while younger viewers were enthused.

Der Stern von Afrika was criticised by reviewers, however, who had hoped for a critical confrontation with the past. Critics pointed to the past collaborations of director Alfred Weidenmann and writer Herbert Reinecker and noted the similarities between Stern von Afrika and Young Eagles (Junge Adler). They spoke of the "teutonic glorification" of the film, likened it to the propaganda style under Goebbels and speculated  that the Der Stern von Afrika would not have looked much different, should the Nazis have won the war.

The Süddeutsche Zeitung commented that "now they're flying again, and they're falling again, they do it most discreetly and no blood flows". In the Berlin Tagesspiegel Karena Niehoff concluded, that the movie might not endorse the Nazis on war, but that it did not explicitly oppose neither. Weidenmann himself claimed in an interview that he was attempting an act of "spiritual cleansing", because "in history there are no completely new beginnings, only continuations." The Frankfurter Rundschau commented: "One leaves the movie theatre thinking, that it has been Marseille today, in two years it could be - if one is simply continuing - Sepp Dietrich."

Critics unanimously agreed that Weidenmann's portrayal of history in Der Stern von Afrika evoked dangerous continuities and was to clean up the past from National Socialism. The FSK was criticized for not restricting the movie to audiences under 18.

References
Citations

Bibliography

 
 
 
 
 
 Tate, Robert (2008). Hans-Joachim Marseille: An Illustrated Tribute to the Luftwaffe's "Star of Africa" . Atglen, PA: Schiffer Publishing. .
 Wübbe, Walter (2001). Hauptmann Hans Joachim Marseille Ein Jagdfliegerschicksal in Daten, Bildern und Dokumenten (in German). Schnellbach, Germany: Verlag Siegfried Bublies. .

External links

 
 Der Stern von Afrika at filmportal.de/en

1957 films
1950s biographical films
1957 war films
German aviation films
Biographical films about military personnel
Films set in the 1940s
Films directed by Alfred Weidenmann
Films shot in the Canary Islands
German biographical films
1950s German-language films
German war films
West German films
World War II aviation films
World War II films based on actual events
Biographical films about aviators
1950s German films